Geophis nasalis , also known as the coffee earth snake, is a snake of the colubrid family. It is found in Mexico and Guatemala.

References

Geophis
Snakes of North America
Reptiles of Mexico
Reptiles of Guatemala
Taxa named by Edward Drinker Cope
Reptiles described in 1868